Rohit Khanna (born September 13, 1976) is an American politician and lawyer serving as the U.S. representative from California's 17th congressional district since 2017. A member of the Democratic Party, he defeated eight-term incumbent Democratic Representative Mike Honda in the general election on November 8, 2016, after first running for the same seat in 2014. Khanna also served as the deputy assistant secretary in the United States Department of Commerce under President Barack Obama from August 8, 2009, to August 2011.

Khanna identifies as a progressive capitalist, and has called for a "new economic patriotism" as a governing philosophy. He states that he only accepts campaign donations from individuals and is one of only six members of the U.S. House of Representatives, and ten members of Congress, who state that they do not take campaign contributions from political action committees (PACs) or corporations.

Early life and education
Rohit Khanna was born on September 13, 1976, in Philadelphia, Pennsylvania, into an Indian Punjabi Hindu family. His parents immigrated to the U.S. from Punjab, India. His father is a chemical engineer who graduated from the Indian Institute of Technology (IIT) and then the University of Michigan; his mother is a former schoolteacher. Khanna's maternal grandfather Amarnath Vidyalankar was from Bhera City, Shahpur District, Punjab Province, British India (now Bhera, Sargodha District, West Punjab, Pakistan) and was a part of the Indian independence movement, working with Lala Lajpat Rai, and spent years in jail in the pursuit of human rights and freedom. In a Boston Globe op-ed, Khanna and Representative John Lewis examined how Gandhi's movement was intertwined with the civil rights movement. Khanna graduated from Council Rock High School North, a public school in Newtown, Bucks County in 1994. He received a Bachelor of Arts degree in economics with honors from the University of Chicago in 1998, where he was a member of Phi Beta Kappa, and a Juris Doctor from Yale Law School of Yale University in 2001. After graduation, Khanna clerked for federal appeals judge Morris Sheppard Arnold in Little Rock, Arkansas. In private practice, he specialized in intellectual property law.

Early work in politics, law, and teaching
As a student at the University of Chicago, Khanna worked for William D. Burns walking precincts during Barack Obama's first campaign for the Illinois Senate in 1996. Khanna interned for Jack Quinn when Quinn served as the chief of staff for Vice President Al Gore. As a sophomore, he interned at former president Jimmy Carter's Carter Center.

Khanna worked at O'Melveny & Myers as an attorney representing technology companies on intellectual property and trade secret issues from 2004 to 2009.

In 2009, President Barack Obama appointed Khanna deputy assistant secretary of the United States Department of Commerce. In that role, Khanna led international trade missions and worked to increase United States exports. He was later appointed to the White House Business Council.

Khanna left the Department of Commerce in August 2011 to join Wilson Sonsini Goodrich & Rosati, a law firm in Silicon Valley. His pro bono legal activity includes work with the Mississippi Center for Justice on several contractor fraud cases on behalf of Hurricane Katrina victims and coauthoring an amicus brief to the U.S. Supreme Court in the Mt. Holly case to allow race discrimination suits under the Fair Housing Act of 1968. As part of a pro bono legal team, Khanna filed an amicus brief on behalf of 13 of the country's leading social scientists in the Supreme Court case Fisher v. University of Texas (2016). That brief included research on how a diverse educational environment benefits students and cited studies showing that race-conscious admissions policies (known as affirmative action) used by institutions like the University of Texas result in a more diverse student body.

Khanna was a visiting lecturer of economics at Stanford University from 2012 to 2016, taught law at the Santa Clara University School of Law, and taught American jurisprudence at San Francisco State University. In 2012 he published a book on American competitiveness in business, Entrepreneurial Nation: Why Manufacturing is Still Key to America's Future. Governor Jerry Brown appointed Khanna to the California Workforce Investment Board in 2012. Khanna served on the board of Planned Parenthood Mar Monte from 2006 until 2013 while on leave from the Obama Administration.

In 2014, Khanna left Wilson Sonsini for his first, unsuccessful campaign for California's 17th congressional district seat. He lost a close election to the incumbent, Mike Honda, but garnered substantial support from the Silicon Valley tech industry. He then took a job as Vice President of Strategic Initiatives at Smart Utility Systems.

In 2016, he challenged Honda again and won, with significant support from venture capital firms and tech companies. He was reelected in 2018, 2020 and 2022.

U.S. House of Representatives

Climate change 
As chair of the House Oversight Subcommittee on the Environment, Khanna presided over the "Big Oil hearing", bringing the CEOs of ExxonMobil, Chevron, Shell, and British Petroleum to appear before Congress under oath to investigate their spreading of disinformation about climate change. The hearing took place on October 28, 2021. As late as 2000, Exxon advertised in The New York Times that "scientists have been unable to confirm" that burning fossil fuels causes climate change. The Big Oil hearings were the first time oil executives were compelled to answer questions under oath about whether their corporations misled the public about the effects burning oil, gas and coal have on raising the earth's temperature and extreme weather patterns like intensifying storms, deadlier wildfires, and worsening droughts. During the hearing, Khanna called on the executives to "Spare us the spin today. We have no interest in it... Spin doesn't work under oath." In an interview with Yahoo Finance, Khanna described the oil industry's role in obfuscating climate science: "We will have scores of evidence that these big oil companies misrepresented to the American public the threat of climate change. They cast doubt and uncertainty, even though they had scientists in their own company telling them that climate change and climate crisis was going to be catastrophic. And that they continue to engage in a pattern of deception." Khanna led the House Committee on Oversight and Reform's two-year investigation, which uncovered documents showing how Big Oil continues to mislead the public about its commitment to climate goals.

Khanna played a key role in year long negotiations with Senator Joe Manchin to secure the $369 billion climate investment in the Inflation Reduction Act and bring House progressives and environmental groups on board.

Khanna criticized oil executives for increasing their oil production in October 28, 2021; conversely, in March 2022, he called for an increase in production after gas prices increased." In a Wall Street Journal piece, Khanna laid out a comprehensive strategy to increase production and supply in the short term to dramatically lower prices for the working class and to have a "moonshot" in renewable energy for the long run to diversify energy sources and stabilize prices. In a New York Times piece, Khanna called on Biden to do "way more" to lower gas prices by having the Strategic Petroleum Reserve buy and sell oil cheaply to stabilize prices.

Khanna called climate activist Greta Thunberg to testify in a hearing on eliminating fossil fuel subsidies and worked with executive director of Greenpeace Annie Leonard to lead the campaign to stop new fossil fuel permitting in California.

As chair of the House Oversight Subcommittee on the Environment, Khanna has been working with President Joe Biden to refashion his climate agenda.

In 2018, Khanna signed on to then Representative-elect Alexandria Ocasio-Cortez's "Green New Deal" proposal, which seeks to form a climate change plan with a goal of a 100% renewable energy economy.

In March 2019, Khanna was one of 14 members of the House to cosponsor the PFAS Detection Act, legislation intended to provide $45 million to the U.S. Geological Survey for the purpose of developing advanced technologies that can detect PFAS and afterward conduct nationwide sampling for PFAS in the environment.

In a December 2019, New York Times op-ed, Khanna and former secretary of state John Kerry laid out a plan for how America should win the green energy race, analogizing it to the space race. Khanna and Kerry called for expanding the electric vehicle tax credit to make it fully refundable at the time of purchase. This would mean that a person would receive money back immediately when buying an electric vehicle rather than waiting a year for a tax refund. They also called for an exponential increase in the Advanced Research Projects Agency's budget and for doubling the budgets for the Energy Department's Office of Energy Efficiency and Renewable Energy and Office of Science, which they say would support renewable energy research to foster the sort of innovation necessary to meet the scale and urgency of the climate challenge. Kerry and Khanna also called for the creation of an infrastructure bank to finance a high-speed rail system to relieve congestion, reduce pollution, increase energy efficiency, and provide alternatives to regional air travel. Finally, Khanna and Kerry called for the US to match China's annual investment in public-private partnerships, noting that China spent $126 billion on renewable energy investments in 2016, while the US spent just over $40 billion.

Khanna has said that creating a Select Committee specifically dedicated to a Green New Deal would be a "very commonsense idea", based on the recent example of the Select Committee on Energy Independence and Global Warming (2007–2011), which proved effective in developing a 2009 bill for cap-and-trade legislation.

Internet Bill of Rights 

In April 2018, Nancy Pelosi asked Khanna to draft the Internet Bill of Rights in wake of Cambridge Analytica's breach and Mark Zuckerberg's testimony to Congress. In October 2018, Khanna released a set of principles for an Internet Bill of Rights, including the right of US citizens to have full knowledge of and control over their personal online data, the right to be notified and consent when an entity seeks to collect or sell one's personal data, and the guarantee of net neutrality.

The inventor of the World Wide Web, Tim Berners-Lee, has endorsed Khanna's principles for the Internet Bill of Rights, saying, "This bill of rights provides a set of principles that are about giving users more control of their online lives while creating a healthier internet economy.”

Former secretary of state Hillary Clinton praised the efforts to establish an Internet Bill of Rights in her keynote speech at Mansfield College, Oxford, saying, "it is past time to demand that all nations and corporations respect the right of individuals to control their own data... There is important work now being done by technologists like Tim Berners-Lee, the inventor of the World Wide Web, and Ro Khanna, the U.S. Congressman representing Silicon Valley. They are trying to develop guidelines for how this could work."

Technology and manufacturing jobs 
Khanna, Senate Majority Leader Chuck Schumer, Senator Todd Young and Representative Mike Gallagher coauthored the Endless Frontier Act, a massive increase in science funding that creates technology hubs across the nation.

The White House invited Khanna to be on stage with President Biden when he signed the Chips and Science bill. This law is based on Khanna’s Endless Frontiers bill and is one of the largest investments in science and in chip manufacturing in American history.

Khanna's Valor Act passed both the House and the Senate and was signed by President Donald Trump on November 21, 2017. The legislation makes it easier for companies to offer veterans apprenticeships.

Trump signed Khanna's second bill, the IDEA Act, into law on December 20, 2018. It requires all federal agencies to modernize their websites to the standard of the private sector.

In a New York Times op-ed, Khanna laid out his vision for bringing technology jobs to rural and small-town America. He called for additional funds to existing community colleges and land grant universities to create technology institutes, endorsed an $80 billion investment in high-speed fiber internet throughout the country, and called for federal incentives for government hiring of rural-based software development companies. Khanna also led a delegation of Silicon Valley executives to Jefferson, Iowa, where they partnered with local community colleges and Pillar Technology to create software designer jobs paying $65,000 a year.

Khanna has argued that Silicon Valley should share its economic success with the rest of the U.S. He has also been a longtime supporter of bringing advanced manufacturing jobs across America, the topic of his book, Entrepreneurial Nation: Why Manufacturing Is Still Key To America's Future.

In March 2017, Khanna traveled to Paintsville, Kentucky, also known as "Silicon Holler", with a bipartisan delegation from Congress, to lend support to TechHire Eastern Kentucky, a program that trains Kentuckians in fields like computer technology and coding. He expressed support for a broad technology apprenticeship program that could help areas of the United States like Appalachia by giving blue-collar workers the skills they need to launch careers in the technology sector. The press has called Khanna the "Ambassador of Silicon Valley."

In May 2017, Khanna stood up for the Appalachian Regional Commission and Manufacturing Externship Partnership, a Reagan-era policy, when Trump's proposed 2018 budget zeroed out its funding. Khanna called for quadrupling the program's budget.

Khanna passed his first legislative initiative as the lead Democrat with Majority Leader Kevin McCarthy to enable veterans to use GI funding for tech training programs.

Khanna called on Silicon Valley executives and technology companies to do more nationwide to create tech jobs and diversify their recruiting efforts by making sure to recruit the next generation of tech workers from not just Ivy League institutions but also state schools and historically black colleges and universities. In a Washington Post op-ed, Khanna wrote, "Tech companies must offer an aspirational vision of how all Americans, regardless of geography, can benefit from a tech-driven economy. This means making investments not just in California, Massachusetts, and New York, but also in start-ups and entrepreneurs in cities and rural communities across the nation."

In February 2018, Khanna and Representative Tim Ryan led a tour of venture capitalists encouraging them to invest in middle America.

Khanna has been called an "unconventional ambassador" for the Democratic Party in bringing technology and innovation across America.

Economics 
Khanna has called on his colleagues to adopt a more progressive economic platform. He is an original co-sponsor of Senator Bernie Sanders's College For All Act, legislation aiming to make public colleges tuition-free. He also has proposed $1 trillion expansion of the earned income tax credit (EITC), financed by a financial transaction tax, to help working families across America.

In the Budget Committee, Khanna pointed out that Trump was for a single-payer healthcare system in 2000. Khanna now supports a House bill to provide "Medicare for All".

Fred Hiatt, the editor of The Washington Post's editorial page, has suggested that Khanna is a thoughtful and new economic voice for the Democratic Party.

Khanna has co-sponsored the Reward Work Act of 2018, to reform US labor law and corporate law by guaranteeing the right of employees in listed companies to elect one third of the board of directors.

Khanna supports the unionization of Starbucks and Maximus, and urged California lawmakers and Governor Gavin Newsom to enact AB257, which sets workplace standards covering the state’s fast-food industry, including wages, working hours, health and safety, and training. Khanna led Congress in writing a letter to Howard Schultz to stand up for Starbucks workers' right to unionize.

LGBTQI+ rights 
Khanna led the legislation to implement a gender-inclusive "X" identifier on U.S. passports that served as a basis for the State Department’s action on the issue.

China 

House Democratic Leader Hakeem Jeffries appointed Khanna to the House Select Committee on Strategic Competition Between the United States and the Chinese Communist Party. Khanna is pushing for rebalancing the U.S. relationship with China on trade and shoring manufacturing. He is also the ranking member on the House Armed Services Subcommittee for Cybersecurity, Innovation Technology, and Information Systems.

NO PAC Caucus 
In 2017, Khanna co-founded the NO PAC Caucus in the House with two other members, Beto O'Rourke and Jared Polis. Three more U.S. Representatives subsequently chose to refuse all contributions from political action committees: Phil Roe, Francis Rooney, and John Sarbanes. These members would not fill out questionnaires or pledge positions to political action committees in exchange for contributions. Khanna and O'Rourke also introduced a bill to ban PACs from contributing to members of Congress.

In December 2018, Khanna, constitutional scholar Bruce Ackerman and Senator Russ Feingold proposed a plan for "Democracy Dollars". Under the proposal, every American citizen would get $50 to spend on federal elections. Khanna has also worked with Republican Representative Mike Gallagher of Wisconsin on reform proposals.

Khanna has said he believes the Democratic Party needs to rethink its political program by running on progressive issues like free college, Medicare for all, and the removal of corporate influence and money from politics.

Reforming H1B abuse 
Khanna co-sponsored H.R.1303, a bipartisan companion bill to the H-1B and L-1 Visa Reform Act of 2017 designed to prevent the exploitation of foreign workers while still recognizing the contributions immigrants make to the US economy. The bill would overhaul the H-1B and L-1 visa programs to protect American workers and crack down on the outsourcing of American jobs abroad.

Safety for Sex Workers 
Khanna partnered with Senator Elizabeth Warren to study the impact of FOSTA/SESTA, including increased violence and sexual assault, on sex workers.

Monopolistic behavior 
Khanna founded and co-chairs the Antitrust Caucus in the House. He has called for a reorientation of antitrust policy to consider the impact on jobs, wages, small business, and innovation, and for scrutiny of the Whole Foods/Amazon merger.

In 2018, along with Senator Bernie Sanders, Khanna proposed the Stop BEZOS Act, which would tax firms for every dollar that employees earn in government health care benefits or food stamps. The law would also make it illegal for any large company to investigate whether or not a potential employee receives federal assistance. Khanna's rationale for the legislation was that it would force corporations to increase salaries for workers or pay for the welfare programs their employees rely on. Economists at the Center on Budget and Policy Priorities published an analysis of the bill finding that it would hurt low-wage workers by giving corporations incentives not to hire workers that rely on federal assistance programs. Khanna challenged Amazon CEO Jeff Bezos directly, saying that if Bezos "announced that [he] would pay everyone at least a $15 minimum wage and reliable hours, [he] could set the standard.” In response to Sanders's and Khanna's legislation and criticism, on October 2, 2018, Bezos announced that Amazon would raise wages of all employees to $15 an hour, effective November 2018.

Khanna wrote a letter to the inspector general of the Department of Defense requesting that he look into TransDigm Group, an aviation-parts manufacturer, and supplier of companies like Boeing. In his letter, Khanna said TransDigm may be bypassing rules that protect U.S. taxpayers since the manufacturer conducts business with the Pentagon. He said he wants to make sure the TransDigm Group is not adding unnecessary costs to the U.S. taxpayer and is not contributing to the $54 billion increase in defense spending proposed by the Trump administration. TransDigm agreed to refund $16.1 million to the Defense Department.

In November 2018, Khanna and Sanders introduced the Stop WALMART Act, intended to ban large companies from buying back their own stock unless the company has a minimum hourly wage of $15 for all employees, allows employees to earn up to seven days of paid sick leave, and pays the company's CEO or highest-paid employee no more than 150 times the median pay for employees.

Pharmaceuticals 
On November 20, 2018, Khanna and Sanders unveiled a bill intended to abolish monopolies on pharmaceuticals, regardless of any patents, and authorize companies to make cheaper generic versions of a drug if its price is higher than the median price in Canada, the United Kingdom, Germany, France and Japan. Sanders said in a statement that the United States was the only country in the world that allowed "pharmaceutical companies to charge any price they want for any reason they want" and that the "greed of the prescription drug industry is literally killing Americans".

Foreign policy 
On November 13, 2017, the House of Representatives passed a resolution condemning civilian deaths, starvation and the spread of disease in Yemen, admitting that much of the responsibility for that humanitarian crisis rests with the U.S. because of its support for a Saudi-led military intervention, and noting that the war has allowed al Qaeda, ISIL, and other groups to thrive. Khanna, along with Representative Jim McGovern, co-sponsored the resolution on the House floor. The resolution passed with a bipartisan majority of 366–30.

On September 27, 2017, Khanna and Representatives Thomas Massie, Mark Pocan, and Walter B. Jones Jr. submitted a bipartisan bill on the floor of the House that would halt U.S. military assistance to the Saudi-led campaign in Yemen on the grounds that Congress never approved the American role in the war. In a joint statement with Pocan, Khanna said, "we aim to restore Congress as the constitutionally mandated branch of government that may declare war and retain oversight over it." In an op-ed for The New York Times detailing the human cost of the continued war in Yemen, Khanna, Pocan, and Jones wrote, "We believe that the American people, if presented with the facts of this conflict, will oppose the use of their tax dollars to bomb and starve civilians in order to further the Saudi monarchy's regional goals."

In December 2017, Khanna criticized President Trump's decision to recognize Jerusalem as the capital of Israel, saying, "The United States and Israel share similar values of peace, democracy, and entrepreneurship. We should always look for ways to strengthen the relationship and address Israel’s legitimate security concerns. The President’s decision to move the U.S. embassy to Jerusalem, however, is misguided and does not advance peace."

On January 18, 2018, Khanna organized a group of 33 House members to sign a letter urging Trump to reestablish military-to-military communications with North Korea. He also called for two other steps that should be taken to alleviate tension with the DPRK. He reintroduced a bill explicitly stating that the President of the United States should not be allowed to launch a nuclear strike without congressional approval, and called upon Trump to send a bipartisan team to negotiate directly with the North Koreans.

In November 2018, after American and Saudi officials announced that the Trump administration had halted its inflight refueling support for the Saudi-led coalition aircraft engaged in Yemen, Khanna called the decision "a major victory" while asserting the need for Congress to pass a resolution ensuring all American involvement was ended. In February 2019, the House Foreign Affairs Committee advanced a bill ending American support for the Saudi intervention in Yemen. Khanna noted that more than "14 million Yemenis—half the country—are on the brink of famine, and at least 85,000 children have already died from hunger and disease as a result of the war" and called on Congress to "end American complicity in the atrocities in Yemen." On February 13, after the House voted to withdraw support for the Saudis in Yemen, Khanna called the day "historic" and said he was "encouraged by the direction people are pushing our party to take on foreign policy, promoting restraint and human rights and with the sense they want Congress to play a much larger role."

A supporter of a more non-interventionist foreign policy, Khanna wrote an op-ed for the Los Angeles Times with Senator Rand Paul on June 1, 2017, making the case against military interventions when US security is not at risk. They argued that the nation is weary of perpetual war since 2001, and that calls for regime change abroad have been a mistake. Khanna has been critical of the strikes on Syria.

On December 22, 2018, Khanna laid out the progressive case for withdrawal of military forces from Syria and Afghanistan, noting that Congress never authorized the involvement of U.S. troops in the Syrian civil war.

Khanna has worked with former president Jimmy Carter, who has agreed to travel to North Korea to meet with Kim Jong-un; in 1994, Carter met with Kim's grandfather, Kim Il-sung.

In 2019, Khanna was one of eight lawmakers to sign a pledge stating their intent "to fight to reclaim Congress’s constitutional authority to conduct oversight of U.S. foreign policy and independently debate whether to authorize each new use of military force" and to bring "the Forever War to a responsible and expedient conclusion" after 17 years of U.S. military conflict.

In February 2019, Khanna introduced a resolution to end the Korean War while leaving American troops in Korea that urged the Trump administration to give "a clear roadmap for achieving a permanent peace regime and the peaceful denuclearization of the Korean peninsula." In a statement, Khanna said diplomacy between North and South Korea had "created a once-in-a-generation opportunity to formally end this war" and advocated that Trump "work hand in hand with our ally, South Korean President Moon Jae-in, to bring the war to a close and advance toward the denuclearization of the peninsula."

In 2019, Khanna and Senator Rand Paul led a bipartisan group of lawmakers in signing a letter to Trump asserting that it is "long past time to rein in the use of force that goes beyond congressional authorization" and they hoped this would "serve as a model for ending hostilities in the future—in particular, as you and your administration seek a political solution to our involvement in Afghanistan.” In a statement, Khanna said, "The president cannot pursue a foreign policy agenda without the advice and consent, let alone the support, of the Congress" and thanked Paul for helping him "in bringing an end to these wars", citing the Constitution as not being partisan.

Khanna has been critical of Brazil's president Jair Bolsonaro, a far-right politician criticized for misogynistic, homophobic and anti-immigrant views who has been embraced by the Trump administration as an ally and partner. In March 2019 Khanna and 29 other Democratic lawmakers wrote a letter to Secretary of State Mike Pompeo that read in part, "Since the election of far-right candidate Jair Bolsonaro as president, we have been particularly alarmed by the threat Bolsonaro’s agenda poses to the LGBTQ+ community and other minority communities, women, labor activists, and political dissidents in Brazil. We are deeply concerned that, by targeting hard-won political and social rights, Bolsonaro is endangering Brazil’s long-term democratic future". Khanna also asked the Trump administration to investigate the case that imprisoned former Brazilian president Luiz Inácio Lula da Silva on corruption charges, following The Intercept’s exposé that showed Judge Sérgio Moro plotted with prosecutors to convict Lula and prevent the Workers’ Party from returning to power.

In 2023, Khanna was among 56 Democrats to vote in favor of H.Con.Res. 21, which directed President Joe Biden to remove U.S. troops from Syria within 180 days.

Police violence 
Khanna led efforts in the House to make the standard for the use of force only as a last resort. This was adopted in the George Floyd Justice in Policing Act, which passed the House. Khanna has also been a vocal advocate of abolishing the filibuster and passing voting rights legislation.

Combating international anti-Semitism 
On April 25, 2018, 57 members of the House of Representatives, led by Khanna, released a condemnation of Holocaust distortion in Ukraine and Poland. They criticized Poland's new Holocaust law and Ukraine's 2015 memory laws glorifying Ukrainian Insurgent Army (UPA) and its leaders, such as Roman Shukhevych. The condemnation came in an open bipartisan letter to Deputy Secretary of State John J. Sullivan. The letter read in part, "We urge you to join us and human rights organizations in standing against anti-Semitism, xenophobia, and all forms of intolerance by calling for the Polish and Ukrainian governments to unequivocally reject Holocaust distortion and the honoring of Nazi collaborators and fully prosecute anti-Semitic crimes. We also ask that you detail what steps are being taken by the United States (U.S.) government to monitor instances of Holocaust distortion and ensure that the U.S. is not supporting or funding groups and individuals that promote or justify anti-Semitism. We believe these steps must include a firm request that these offensive laws be repealed." California's State Assembly passed a separate resolution calling upon Congress to pressure Polish lawmakers to change this new Holocaust speech law. Andrzej Pawluszek, an adviser to Polish Prime Minister Mateusz Morawiecki, called the claims in Congress's letter "irresponsible and shocking." The Association of Jewish Organizations and Communities of Ukraine (Vaad of Ukraine) also rebuked the letter, calling it "anti-Ukrainian defamation" like that used by Russian propaganda during the war in Ukraine.

Combating Hindu nationalism 
Varghese K. George of The Hindu called Khanna "an unequivocal and strong supporter of a pluralist America, and India-U.S. ties," who "for the same reason rejects Hindutva and its exclusive nationalism." In a statement targeted at Tulsi Gabbard, Khanna said, "it is the duty of every American politician of Hindu faith to stand for pluralism, reject Hindutva, and speak for equal rights for Hindus, Muslims, Sikhs, Buddhists and Christians", a statement that was criticized in a letter published by the Hindu American Foundation (HAF) and signed by what was described as "a record number of 230 Indian-American organisations in the US", who also objected to Khanna's membership in the Congressional Caucus on Pakistan.

Biden administration 
As of October 2021, Khanna had voted in line with Joe Biden's stated position 100% of the time.

Abortion

Khanna opposed the overturning of Roe v. Wade, calling it "heartbreaking". He said the decision "strips Americans of their basic freedom and endangers the health and safety of millions. It strips women of the right to make their own decisions about their bodies and their futures", especially low-income women, women of color, and women living in rural areas.

Term limits
Khanna has led a bill to limit Supreme Court justices' terms. In 2022, he called the Court's recent conservative decisions anti-egalitarian and anti-democratic.

Free speech

Khanna is an advocate of free speech. In 2022, the publication of the Twitter Files highlighted his efforts to stop the former Twitter administration from censoring the New York Post's Hunter Biden laptop story.

Committee assignments 
 Committee on Armed Services
 Subcommittee on Cyber, Innovative Technologies and Information Systems
 Subcommittee on Strategic Forces
 Committee on Agriculture
Subcommittee on Commodity Exchanges, Energy, and Credit
Subcommittee on Livestock and Foreign Agriculture
 United States House Committee on Oversight and Reform
Subcommittee on Environment (Chair)
Subcommittee on Government Operations

Caucus memberships
Climate Solutions Caucus
NOPAC Caucus
India Caucus
Pakistan Caucus
Vietnamese Caucus
Antitrust Caucus
Congressional Progressive Caucus
Medicare for All Caucus

Elections

2004 

He received endorsements from prominent officials, including Matt Gonzalez, and newspapers, including the San Mateo County Times, but lost.

2012 

He raised $1.2 million, receiving support from Governor Brown, House Minority Leader Nancy Pelosi, former Secretary of Transportation Norman Mineta, Representatives Zoe Lofgren and Anna Eshoo, and businessmen Vinod Khosla and John W. Thompson. Khanna's fundraising total for the fourth quarter of 2011 exceeded that of all but two House candidates nationwide. Eric Swalwell defeated Stark in 2012.

2014 

He assembled a campaign team composed of top members of President Barack Obama's reelection team, including Jeremy Bird, Obama's 2012 national field director, and Steve Spinner, one of Obama's top three fundraisers. Khanna was backed by executives at Google, Facebook, Yahoo! and other tech companies, and by the editorial boards of the San Jose Mercury News, the San Francisco Chronicle, the Oakland Tribune, and the Contra Costa Times. He earned the endorsement of San Jose Mayor Chuck Reed, and also won the endorsement of the San Jose Silicon Valley Chamber of Commerce.

A lawsuit was filed before the Sacramento County Superior Court alleging that Khanna had recruited candidates with similar names to enter the race as Republicans to split the Republican vote three ways. On March 28, 2014, the Court disqualified one of the candidates and ruled that Khanna had no connection with the incident.

On November 4, 2014, incumbent congressman Honda defeated Khanna 69,561 (51.8%) votes to 64,847 (48.2%). Khanna's campaign was funded by many of the technology industry's biggest names, including Yahoo chief executive Marissa Mayer, Facebook executive Sheryl Sandberg, Google Chairman Eric Schmidt, Napster founder Sean Parker, investor Marc Andreessen, and venture capitalist Steve Westly.

2016 

In June 2015, Khanna announced his intention to run again for the House in California's 17th congressional district. He took no donations from PACs or corporations for his 2016 campaign. Khanna raised $480,500 from individuals associated with the securities and investment industry and $170,752 from individuals associated with the electronics manufacturing industry. All these donations were subject to the $2,700 individual contributions cap. On June 7, 2016, Khanna won the primary with 52,059 (39.1%) votes. Honda came in second with 49,823 (37.4%) votes. The two Democrats advanced to the general election on November 8, 2016. Khanna became the Representative-elect on November 8 after defeating Honda, 61% to 39%. According to the East Bay Times, Khanna won with a campaign platform focused on "moving the Democratic Party to a more progressive stance." He held his first town hall as a congressman on February 22, 2017, at Ohlone College.

During his successful campaign for Congress, Khanna endorsed Bernie Sanders for president of the United States in 2016.

On May 10, 2017, Khanna officially joined the Justice Democrats. He is a member of the Congressional Progressive Caucus and the Congressional Asian Pacific American Caucus.

2018 

Khanna won reelection, defeating Republican Ron Cohen in the 2018 general election, by a margin of 72.5% to 27.5%.

2020 

Khanna was reelected, defeating Republican Ritesh Tandon in the general election with 71.3% of the vote.

Khanna co-chaired the Bernie Sanders 2020 presidential campaign.

2022

Personal life
Khanna resides in Fremont, California, with his wife Ritu Khanna (née Ahuja), a fellow Indian-American, and their two children. Ritu's father is Monte Ahuja, who in 1975 founded Transtar, an automotive transmission parts supply company in Solon, Ohio.

As of 2016, Khanna was a vice president for Strategic Initiatives at Smart Utility Systems, an energy efficiency company with an office in Santa Clara. Smart Utility Systems produces software for water conservation and for reducing electricity consumption.

Khanna is an Indian-American, a Punjabi-American and a practicing Hindu-American, describing his faith as "Gandhian Hinduism".

Bibliography

See also
 Congressional Asian Pacific American Caucus
 List of United States representatives from California
 List of Asian Americans and Pacific Islands Americans in the United States Congress
2014 United States House of Representatives elections in California
 Politics of California

References

External links

 Congressman Ro Khanna official U.S. House website
 Ro Khanna for Congress campaign website
 
 

|-

Living people
1976 births
American people of Punjabi descent
American Hindus
21st-century American male writers
21st-century American non-fiction writers
21st-century American politicians
American business writers
American male non-fiction writers
American male writers of Indian descent
American political writers
American politicians of Indian descent
Asian-American members of the United States House of Representatives
Asian-American people in Pennsylvania politics
Bernie Sanders 2020 presidential campaign
California lawyers
California politicians of Indian descent
Gandhians
Lawyers from Philadelphia
Members of the United States Congress of Indian descent
Democratic Party members of the United States House of Representatives from California
Non-interventionism
Obama administration personnel
People from Fremont, California
Politicians from Philadelphia
Santa Clara University School of Law faculty
Stanford University faculty
United States Department of Commerce officials
University of Chicago alumni
Writers from California
Yale Law School alumni